Charlot was a French coxswain and Olympic champion.

Charlot won a gold medal in coxed fours at the 1900 Summer Olympics, as coxswain for the French team Cercle de l'Aviron Roubaix.

References

External links

French male rowers
Olympic rowers of France
Rowers at the 1900 Summer Olympics
Olympic gold medalists for France
Year of birth missing
Year of death missing
Olympic medalists in rowing
Coxswains (rowing)
Medalists at the 1900 Summer Olympics
Place of birth missing
Place of death missing